Warekena Velha (Guarequena Antiguo, Old Wareken), also Warekena of San Miguel, is an endangered Arawakan language most closely related to Mandahuaca.

References 

Arawakan languages
Upper Amazon